Schroeder (Schröder) is a municipality in the state of Santa Catarina in the South region of Brazil.

It is named for Christian Mathias Schröder, a German senator who organized a colony in the area.

See also
List of municipalities in Santa Catarina

References

Municipalities in Santa Catarina (state)